Joseph M. Forbes (March 2, 1910 – January 20, 1976) was an American football and basketball coach and physical education professor. He was the head football coach at Humboldt State College—now known as Humboldt State University—from 1946 to 1947, compiling a record of 10–7–1. Forbes served two stints at the head basketball coach at Humboldt State, from 1946 to 1949 and again for the 1952–53 season, tallying mark of 32–39. He was also a professor at Humboldt State for 27 years chairman o the Department of Health and Physical Educator for 25 years until his retirement in 1972. Forbes died on January 20, 1976.

Head coaching record

Football

References

External links
 

1910 births
1976 deaths
Humboldt State Lumberjacks football coaches
Humboldt State Lumberjacks men's basketball coaches
Humboldt State University faculty
Basketball coaches from Illinois